David Whitaker may refer to:

David Whitaker (artist) (1938–2007), British abstract artist and teacher
David Whitaker (screenwriter) (1928–1980), English story editor of the Doctor Who series
David Whitaker (composer) (1931–2012), English composer, songwriter, arranger, and conductor
David Whitaker (field hockey), Great Britain hockey coach in 1984 Summer Olympics
David Whitaker (publisher) (died 2021), British publisher and magazine editor
David A. Whitaker (born 1988), British playwright, actor and theatre director
David Whitaker (politician), member of the Arkansas House of Representatives

See also
David Whittaker